A member of the Presidency of the Central Committee of the League of Communists of Yugoslavia (SKJ) for the Socialist Autonomous Province of Kosovo existed from the 11th Congress in 1978 to the dissolution of the SKJ at the 14th Congress in 1990.

See also
Socialist Autonomous Province of Kosovo

League of Communists of Yugoslavia
History of Kosovo
Socialist Republic of Serbia